Khani Babalu (also Romanized as Khānī Babalū; also known as Khānī Babahlū) is a village in Arshaq-e Gharbi Rural District, Moradlu District, Meshgin Shahr County, Ardabil Province, Iran. At the 2006 census, its population was 63, in 15 families.

References 

Towns and villages in Meshgin Shahr County